The International Journal of Jaina Studies is an open access, peer reviewed journal published by the School of Oriental and African Studies at the University of London since 2005.

External links 
 International Journal of Jaina Studies — official website @ School of Oriental and African Studies, University of London
 Archive — open access to all papers published by the journal

Religious studies journals